Nesterov, or Nesterova (feminine; Нестерова), is a Russian surname. Notable people with the surname include:

Alexander Nesterov (born 1985), Russian ice hockey forward
Andriy Nesterov (born 1990), Ukrainian football defender
Ignatiy Nesterov (born 1983), Uzbekistani football goalkeeper
Margarita Nesterova (born 1989), Russian swimmer
Mikhail Nesterov (1862–1942), Russian painter
Nikita Nesterov (born 1993), Russian ice hockey defenceman
 (1883–1941), Russian herpetologist
Pyotr Nesterov (1887–1914), Russian aviator, the namesake of the Nesterov Loop aerobatic maneuver
Svetlana Nesterova, Russian composer and violinist
Vladimir Nesterov (1949–2022), general director of the Russian State Research and Production Space Center
Yuri Nesterov (born 1967), Russian handball player
Yurii Nesterov, Russian mathematician 

Russian-language surnames